The Araneta City Cyberpark is a  office development located in the Araneta City in Cubao, Quezon City. Located along the southern part of the mixed-use commercial development, the office complex is currently undergoing a ₱20 billion redevelopment under a new master plan, consisting of five green office towers, retail spaces, and an outdoor park.

The complex is designed by ASYA Design and ACI Inc. serves as the owner and developer of the project. The redevelopment project is part of the Araneta City Master Plan.

History

First Master Plan (2007-2008)
The Araneta City Cyberpark is part of the Araneta City master plan unveiled in 2000, and was rolled out in 2002, situated in an   property along Gen. Aguinaldo, Gen. Araneta, and Gen. McArthur Avenues, primarily for Business Process Outsourcing/Information Technology (BPO-IT) office development. The development sits on a jeepney terminal servicing areas around Quezon City and the Province of Rizal, and the private Araneta White House (Bahay na Puti) complex. The development also sits on the former lot occupied by Fiesta Carnival, a  amusement park formerly occupying the Shopwise Hypermarket complex. As the carnival declined in the 1990s due to rising competition from other amusement parks, mall-based entertainment, political unrest, and other technological shifts, the Araneta Group decided to move the carnival into an open lot located in the south west corner lot of the complex, across SM Cubao. Unfortunately, the outdoor complex did not click the public and was completely closed down years later.

From the beginning of 2001, as part of Arroyo administration's economic programs, the steady rise of the demand of business process outsourcing firms being founded in the country continues to lead the investments in the country, as well as creating jobs in various sectors, and enabling the country to take a spot in the global outsourcing market in 2005 by 3% of the total global output, making the BPO industry one of the fastest growing industries in the country. Due to the successful launches of various BPO companies, the rising BPO industry also attracted the Araneta Group prompted the Araneta Group to launch the Cyberpark Master Plan in 2007, following the completion of the Gateway Office Building in 2005, which is primarily occupied by Accenture. The Cyberpark also became part of the Araneta Center Redevelopment Plan in 2006, following the opening of the Gateway Mall in 2004, which also featured the Manhattan Gardens, the Gateway Tower, and a proposed 400-room business hotel, which became known today as Novotel Manila Araneta City. The first master plan of the Cyberpark was laid out in 2007, and began construction in the same year, before being completed on 2008. The complex is composed of 2 4-storey low-rise buildings, with 5 additional low rise buildings planned during the early planning phases. The two buildings were occupied by companies, such as Telus, APAC Customer Services Inc., Advanced Contact Solutions, Agentworx Contact Solutions, and Expert Global Solutions.

Updated Master Plan (2012-present)
Following the success of the Cyberpark, the development led in an increase of demand for more office spaces within the area. Guided with the continuous success of the BPO industry and related companies within the area, as well as an increase of deals, partnerships, and potential investment opportunities between the Araneta Group and various BPO firms, and a rising trend of green office developments throughout the country, a newer and updated master plan was finalized, consisting of 5 PEZA certified and LEED-approved towers, with 3 levels of retail podium spaces, surrounding an rooftop park from the future Gateway Mall 3, and connected to malls and nearby buildings such as SM Cubao, Ali Mall, the Manhattan Gardens condominiums, the Araneta Coliseum, the New Frontier Theater, the Novotel Manila Araneta City and the upcoming Ibis Styles Araneta City.

The early planning stages of the complex began in 2012, wherein among the plans laid out consists of an open-air outdoor park with an intersecting road in between the towers, while having a total of 5 levels for retail, directly connected via footbridges. In 2014, the master plan was finalized, wherein the development will consist of 5 towers with varied architectural designs. The implementation of the new master plan is set to cost ₱20 billion and commenced with the construction of Cyberpark Tower 1 in April 2014, the Cyberpark Tower 2 in February 2016, and the Cyberpark Tower 3 in 2023. The development is also outlined to interconnect all office towers within the Cyberpark through the complex's basement parking and retail levels, and will also include an planned road extension of the Gen. Araneta Avenue, linking the road to the P. Tuazon Boulevard.

Location and Features
The development is also connected to major transport hubs such as the MRT 3 Cubao Station, the LRT 2 Cubao Station and transport terminals, with future connections to the Gateway Mall 3, and the Gateway Mall 2, primarily attracting business process outsourcing and corporate services companies, with plans laid out to also cater Philippine Offshore Gaming Operators. The complex also features a variety of green initiatives and an ultra-high-speed fiber optic network infrastructure, enhancing the city's network connectivity, capable of reaching 5G networks. The targeted completion of the entire green office complex is set within 2030.

Structures
The Araneta City Cyberpark consists of five LEED approved towers, interconnected with direct connections with the proposed Gateway Mall 3 and other properties within the Araneta City. The following table lies the current updates of the towers as of February 2023:

Buildings

Telus House
The Telus House is one of the first low-rise, 4-storey buildings in the original Cyberpark plan completed in 2008, and currently houses Telus as its main tenant. The building has   of total office space, and features retail stores located at the ground floor.

The building will soon be demolished in order to give way for the construction of the Gateway Mall 3, a 5-storey  expansion project of the Gateway Mall, and the Cyberpark Tower 4. The future development will feature eco-friendly initiatives, additional retail spaces and an elevated, green, outdoor park, and is currently on the planning stage.

Cyberpark Tower 1
The first tower in the project, and standing 30 storeys high on the former EGS parking lot. Formerly known as the "Gateway Tower 2" project, which is named after the Gateway Tower, the construction of the tower started in February 2014, and was completed in May 2016. The Cyberpark Tower 1 has  of office space, with 3 basement parking levels, 3 levels of retail, and houses companies like 24-7 Intouch, ProbeCX (formerly Stellar), Sterling Talent Solutions, Genesys, The Vibal Group, and Accenture, which serves as the tower's main tenant, and the company's third branch within the area, aside from the Gateway Office Building and the Gateway Tower. The tower is also occupied by two gyms, beauty services stalls, banks, a 7-Eleven convenience store; restaurants, food stalls and coffee stores such as Taco Bell, CoCo Fresh Tea & Juice and Starbucks; and The Medical City Clinic Cubao Branch, located within the tower's retail area. The tower is also connected to nearby SM Cubao via Elevated Bridge. In November 2022, PartnerHero became the tower's latest tenant, as the company opened their first private office in the country, and occupies the 7th floor in the tower.

One of the planned original tenants of the tower was Expert Global Solutions (EGS), after the company announced its plans to relocate their operation to the tower in early 2016. However, after lengthy negotiations with the Araneta Group and Alorica's acquisition of EGS, the plan was cancelled and the company decided to remain in their operations to the Alorica Building until March 2019, as the company moved its operations to Cyberpark Tower 2.

The tower features an asymmetrical window facade with floor-to-ceiling double glazed windows for energy efficiency, a rainwater collection system, and is also equipped with Solar panels located at the roof deck of the building. The tower will also soon be directly connected to the Gateway Mall 3, and the Cyberpark Tower 4.

Cyberpark Tower 2
The second tower of the project, standing 31 storeys high on the former Jeepney Terminal servicing areas within Quezon City and the Province of Rizal, the Cyberpark Tower 2 has  of office space, featuring a curved building design, floor-to-ceiling double-glazed energy-efficient windows, smart elevators, side balconies with planters, and a rainwater recovery system. The tower was also planned to include vertical trellises and erect a spire from the tower's side balconies, to the tower's helipad area. However, the plan was scrapped during the tower's construction phase. Groundbreaking for the construction of the tower started in February 2016, while construction works began on the 3rd quarter of 2016, and was topped off in March 2018, before being completed in December 2018, as tenants and stores began occupying the tower.

The tower, like its predecessor, the Cyberpark Tower 1, has 3 basement parking levels with 2 levels of retail spaces and houses companies like Alorica, serving as one of the main tenants of the tower, occupying 7 floors aboveground and a recruitment hub located at the ground floor of the tower. The tower is also housed by companies owned by the Philippine Pizza Inc. (PPI), a subsidiary of the Araneta Group, such as Pizza Hut, and Dairy Queen, after relocating their operations from the Aurora Tower, the company's former headquarters, in 2019. Aside from Alorica, the tower is also housed by various BPO companies such as Ibex, Acquire BPO, Offshore Business Processing, and HasTech IT Limited. The tower is also set to be occupied by banks, convenience stores, food stalls, and restaurants within the tower's retail lobby at the ground level.

Cyberpark Tower 3
The third tower of the project, Cyberpark Tower 3 is currently under construction, soon to rise on the former Alorica (EGS) Building site. The tower will be similarly designed to the Cyberpark Tower 2, standing 31 storeys high, and having  of office spaces, while having  of gross floor area. The tower also features a curved building design, floor-to-ceiling double-glazed energy-efficient windows, smart elevators, side balconies with planters, and a rainwater recovery system. The demolition of the Alorica Building began in June 2019, while the groundbreaking for the construction of the tower started afterwards, in September 2019. The tower is slated to be completed on 2022, however, due to the effects of the COVID-19 pandemic in the Philippines, as well as market driven factors and financial problems, the construction of the project was delayed. In August 2022, the general contractor for the project was awarded to Datem Incorporated, while the tower's groundbreaking phase continued in December 2022. On 6 February 2023, the first concrete pouring of the tower began in a ceremony attended by various Araneta Group officials, along with Binibining Pilipinas contestants. The tower is expected to be completed within the first quarter of 2025.

Cyberpark Tower 4
The fourth tower of the project, Cyberpark Tower 4 is a planned 30-storey office building planned to be built on the Telus House and across Cyberpark Tower 2, with a direct connection to the Gateway Mall 3. The tower will also have the same features with its predecessors, and is currently on the planning stage.

Cyberpark Tower 5
The fifth and final office building planned in the Cyberpark complex, which is currently in the planning stages. The Cyberpark Tower 5 is a planned 40-storey office building planned to be built on the Jeepney Terminal and the private Araneta White House complex, which includes the Colombian Honorary Consulate, located along Cyberpark Tower 2, the Cyberpark Tower 3, and P. Tuazon Boulevard. The planned tower will feature an oval shaped building design.

References 

Buildings and structures in Quezon City
Office buildings in Metro Manila
Office buildings completed in 2014
21st-century architecture in the Philippines